Jharkhand Rai University is a private university in Ranchi, Jharkhand state, India. It was established by the Jharkhand State Legislature under the Jharkhand Rai University Act, 2011.

Faculties 
 Science and Engineering
 Commerce and Management
 Computer Science and Information Technology
 Fashion Technology
 Humanities and Social Science
 Journalism and Mass Communication
 Library and Information Science

See also
Education in India
List of private universities in India
List of institutions of higher education in Jharkhand

References

External links

Universities and colleges in Ranchi
Universities in Jharkhand
Educational institutions established in 2011
2011 establishments in Jharkhand
Private universities in India